Pine Lake State Park is a state park of Iowa, US. The park comprises  encompassing two lakes:  Lower Pine Lake and  Upper Pine Lake. The park is located near Eldora and Steamboat Rock.

Camping
The Pine Lake campground has 124 camping units with electrical hook-ups, modern showers, restroom facilities and a trailer dump station. Half of the campsites are available on a first-come, first-served basis, while the remainder must be reserved.

Cabins
The park contains four stone and timber cabins that were built by the Civilian Conservation Corps and the Works Progress Administration in the 1930s. The cabins can be reserved online through the park reservation system.

Trails
Trails are marked with points of interest that correspond with trail brochures available at trail heads, the campground and the park office.

There is also a  Lake-to-Lake State Park Bike Route connecting Pine Lake and George Wyth Memorial State Parks. Details here:

Lake
Both lakes are stocked with bass, crappie, northerns, and catfish. The Iowa River borders a portion of the park and is noted for its channel catfish and smallmouth bass. A beach is located on the lower lake.

Boats and canoes are no longer available for rental, and there was no concessionaire for 2009. There are boat ramps are on both lakes. Only electric motors may be used.

References

External links
Pine Lake State Park

Civilian Conservation Corps in Iowa
State parks of Iowa
Protected areas of Hardin County, Iowa
Works Progress Administration in Iowa
Lakes of Iowa
Bodies of water of Hardin County, Iowa